Robert George Hess  (born May 19, 1955 in Middleton, Nova Scotia) is a Canadian retired professional ice hockey defenceman. He played in the National Hockey League for the St. Louis Blues, Buffalo Sabres, and Hartford Whalers. Between 1982 and 1984 Hess played in Switzerland's Nationalliga A for HC Lugano and EHC Kloten.

Playing career
Hess was drafted in the second round, 26th overall, by the St. Louis Blues in the 1974 NHL amateur draft.

He appeared in 329 NHL games scoring 27 goals and 95 assists for 122 points. He is a member of the St. Louis Blues Alumni Association.

Transactions
October 30, 1980 - Traded by the St. Louis Blues with the 4th round pick in the 1981 NHL Entry Draft (Anders Wikberg) to the Buffalo Sabres for Bill Stewart
December, 1984 - Signed as a free agent with the Hartford Whalers

Career statistics

Regular season and playoffs

External links
 

1955 births
Living people
Buffalo Sabres players
Canadian expatriate ice hockey players in the United States
Canadian ice hockey defencemen
Hartford Whalers players
Ice hockey people from Nova Scotia
Indianapolis Checkers (CHL) players
Kansas City Blues players
Maine Mariners players
New Westminster Bruins players
People from Middleton, Nova Scotia
Rochester Americans players
St. Louis Blues announcers
St. Louis Blues draft picks
St. Louis Blues players
Salt Lake Golden Eagles (CHL) players
Salt Lake Golden Eagles (IHL) players